Ann Henricksson and Christiane Jolissaint were the defending champions but only Henricksson competed that year with Gretchen Magers.

Henricksson and Magers lost in the semi-finals to Elizabeth Smylie and Wendy Turnbull.

Martina Navratilova and Pam Shriver won in the final 6–3, 6–3 against Smylie and Turnbull.

Seeds
Champion seeds are indicated in bold text while text in italics indicates the round in which those seeds were eliminated. The top four seeded teams received byes into the second round.

Draw

Final

Top half

Bottom half

References
 1989 New South Wales Open Women's Doubles Draw

Women's Doubles
Doubles